The first leg of 2012 Apertura Final also known as La tarde de los paraguas felices (The evening of happy umbrellas)  was the first leg of the matches that chose the champion of the Torneo de Apertura 2012 of Chile. 

In the match, O'Higgins faced Universidad de Chile at the Estadio El Teniente, winning the home club 2:1 with goals of Juan Rodrigo Rojas and Alejandro López. The goal for the away team was scored by Guillermo Marino.

Road to the final

Classification stage
The Classification Stage began in January and ended in July.

Standings

Playoff stage
For all ties, the lower-seeded team play the first leg at home.

Details

References

O'Higgins F.C. matches
2012 Primera División de Chile season